The 1963 Luton by-election was held on 7 November 1963 following the resignation of the former "radio doctor" and Conservative Minister Charles Hill.  Hill had a majority of over 5,000 at the 1959 general election, but the Luton seat was won by the Labour candidate Will Howie with a majority of 3,749.

References

Luton 1963
Luton by-election
Luton
Luton by-election 1963
Politics of Luton